P.K.R. Arts College for Women (P.K.R.) is an Autonomous arts and science college affiliated to Bharathiar University located in Gobichettipalayam, Tamil Nadu, India. It was founded in 1994.

History 
The college was established in the year 1994 by Dhandapani Rural Charitable Trust. It is a women's college and is affiliated to Bharathiar University, Coimbatore. P.K.R. School of Management was later established in 1997. The M.B.A. & M.C.A. courses are approved by AICTE, New Delhi.

Courses 
 Fourteen undergraduate courses
 Seven postgraduate programmes
 M.B.A. & M.C.A.
 M.Phil and Ph.D programmes

See also 
 Gobichettipalayam
 Bharathiar University

References

Arts colleges in India
Women's universities and colleges in Tamil Nadu
Universities and colleges in Erode district
Education in Gobichettipalayam
Educational institutions established in 1994
1994 establishments in Tamil Nadu